Darwin Lumbantobing (born 22 August 1956) is an Indonesian religious leader, public speaker, and author who served as the 16th Ephorus of Huria Kristen Batak Protestan (HKBP), a Protestant Christian denomination in Indonesia from 2016 to 2020. He was succeeded by Robinson Butarbutar

Early Life and Education 
Lumbantobing was born in the city of Medan, Indonesia. He was raised in a Christian family and was heavily influenced by his faith from a young age. He received his education in local schools and later studied theology at a seminary in Jakarta. He graduated with honors.

Career 
After completing his studies, Lumbantobing began working as a pastor within the BCPC. He quickly progressed through the ranks and was appointed as the Ephorus of the church in 2016. As Ephorus, Lumbantobing was responsible for overseeing the spiritual and administrative aspects of the HKBP. He is also actively involved in community outreach and social welfare programs. Under Lumbantobing's leadership, the HKBP has seen growth in terms of membership and influence. He has received recognition for his contributions to the HKBP and to society at large. In addition to his work within the HKBP, Lumbantobing is also a public speaker and author. He has written several books on theology and spiritual development. Lumbantobing has received several awards and accolades in recognition of his contributions to the BCPC and to society as a whole. He is considered to be one of the most influential leaders in the Christian community in Indonesia.

References 

Living people
1956 births
Indonesian Lutherans
People of Batak descent
People from Asahan Regency